Hamas of Iraq (Arabic: حماس العراق Ḥamās al-'Irāq) is a Sunni militia group based in Iraq, which split from the 1920 Revolution Brigade on 18 March 2007. The group claims to have released videos of its attack on US troops. The 1920 Revolution Brigade insists that Hamas in Iraq was involved in assisting US troops in their recent Diyala operations against Al-Qaeda in Iraq. Iraqi Prime Minister Nouri al-Maliki has feared the US-armed 'concerned local citizens' are an armed Sunni opposition in the making, and has argued that such groups should be under the command of the Iraqi Army or police. On October 11, 2007, the militia group joined a political council that embraced armed insurgency against American forces.

Political program 
Hamas in Iraq released a political program in April 2007 with some of the following provisions:
 "The movement believes in armed jihad as a means for expelling the occupier, and calls on public opinion and agencies and international institutions to respect this right... of all peoples to resist occupation, and to distinguish between that and armed crimes which target innocent civilians."
 "We believe in a necessary link between military efforts and political action as two mutually supportive instruments for achieving the goals of resistance for liberation and salvation and preventing the fundamentalist movements from harvesting the fruits of the resistance."
 "We confirm the necessity of continuing the killing until the exit of the last soldier from the occupying armies, and to not negotiate with the enemy except with an agreement of the factions of the jihad and the Iraqi resistance; and under the appropriate circumstances and conditions."

In July 2007, The Guardian reported that the group participated with other insurgent groups in an alliance called the Political Council for the Iraqi Resistance, which includes a range of Islamist and nationalist-leaning groups which was formed to negotiate with the Americans in anticipation of an early US withdrawal. Main planks of the joint political program included "a commitment to free Iraq from foreign troops, rejection of cooperation with parties involved in political institutions set up under the occupation and a declaration that decisions and agreements made by the US occupation and Iraqi government are null and void."

Operations in Diyala in August 2007
The 1920 Revolution Brigades insists that Hamas in Iraq was involved in assisting US troops in their recent Diyala operations against al-Qaeda in Iraq in August 2007.

The insistences occurred when The Washington Post reported in a telephone interview with Lt. Col. Joseph Davidson, executive officer of the 2nd Infantry Division, U.S. forces were now "partnering with Sunni insurgents from the 1920 Revolution Brigades, which includes former members of ousted president Saddam Hussein's disbanded army." The 1920 Revolution Brigades replied that: "We say to … the occupation and to your followers and agents that you made a very big lie" in linking us with the Diyala anti-al Qaida campaign. The group maintains that the US military spokesman should have referred to "Iraqi Hamas", which consisted of Brigades before the operations.

See also
 List of armed groups in the Iraqi Civil War
 United Jihad Factions Council
 1920 Revolution Brigades

Footnotes

External links

Organization links
 Iraqi Jihad Group Establishes New Political Framework called ‘Hamas-Iraq’ - document detailing the creation of Hamas Iraq

Denial of working with coalition forces
 Hamas Iraq denies negotiations
 American site publishes false news about the Iraqi resistance

Other links
 DefenseLink: Tribal Leaders in Diyala Province Band Together - US Army article discussing which details possible cooperation between Hamas-Iraq and US military.
 Website of Hamas of Iraq (In Arabic)

Arab militant groups
Organizations established in 2007
Iraqi insurgency (2003–2011)
Islamic organizations based in Iraq
Islamist insurgent groups
Terrorism in Iraq
Muslim Brotherhood
Rebel groups in Iraq
2007 establishments in Iraq
Organizations designated as terrorist by Iraq
Organizations based in Asia designated as terrorist